HMS Hindostan was an 80-gun two-deck second rate ship of the line of the Royal Navy, launched on 2 August 1841.

In 1865 she became an auxiliary to the training ship Britannia at Dartmouth, and remained part of that establishment until it was transferred ashore to the Royal Naval College there.  She joined the boy artificers' training establishment at Portsmouth that year and was renamed Fisgard III.  She was renamed Hindostan in 1920, and sold to J. B. Garnham & Sons in 1921. After being broken up, her timbers and those of HMS Impregnable were used in 1924 in the renovation of the Liberty department store in London.

Notes

References

Lavery, Brian (2003). The Ship of the Line - Volume 1: The Development of the Battlefleet 1650-1850.  London: Conway Maritime Press. .

External links
 

Ships of the line of the Royal Navy
Ships built in Plymouth, Devon
1841 ships